USS Habersham (AK-186) was an  that served the US Navy during the final months of World War II. She was named for Habersham County, Georgia.

Construction
Habersham was launched 7 June 1944, by the Walter Butler Shipbuilding Company in Superior, Wisconsin, under a Maritime Commission contract, MC hull 2117. She was sponsored by Mrs. Carl Gray, Jr. and acquired by the US Navy on 26 April 1945, and commissioned 12 May 1945.

Service history

World War II service
Following shakedown training off Galveston, Texas the ship sailed 2 June 1945, for Gulfport, Mississippi, to take on cargo and departed four days later to join the Pacific Fleet. Habersham arrived at Pearl Harbor via the Canal Zone 30 June, unloaded her cargo, and returned to San Francisco with passengers and cargo 12 July. She then loaded cargo and sailed 21 July for Eniwetok, arriving on 7 August.

Post-war decommissioning
Habersham was at Eniwetok when the surrender of Japan was announced, and departed 9 September to carry cargo for occupation forces in Japan.  Arriving Tokyo Bay, 17 September, she unloaded cargo and departed for Guam and San Francisco 27 November. She arrived 12 January 1946 and sailed for the East Coast on 11 February, arriving Norfolk, Virginia 6 March. Habersham decommissioned at Baltimore, Maryland 9 April 1946 and was returned to the Maritime Commission.

Merchant
Sold to the Thordén Lines AB, for $693,862, for merchant service, she became Rosa Thordén. In 1952, she was sold to the Korean Shipping Corporation, and renamed Pusan. She was again renamed in 1974, to Busan, and then sold to Ah Jin Shipping Ltd., in 1976. She was sold again in 1976, to Sammisa Shipping Co, Ltd., and renamed Sam Dae. She was finally sold to Tai Young Shipping Co, Ltd., in 1978. On 14 April 1979 she was damaged by fire and scrapped later that year in Inchon, South Korea.

Notes 

Citations

Bibliography 

Online resources

External links

 

Alamosa-class cargo ships
Habersham County, Georgia
Ships built in Superior, Wisconsin
1944 ships
World War II auxiliary ships of the United States